The Times is a British daily national newspaper based in London. It began in 1785 under the title The Daily Universal Register, adopting its current name on 1 January 1788. The Times and its sister paper The Sunday Times (founded in 1821) are published by Times Newspapers, since 1981 a subsidiary of News UK, in turn wholly owned by News Corp. The Times and The Sunday Times, which do not share editorial staff, were founded independently and have only had common ownership since 1966. In general, the political position of The Times is considered to be centre-right.

The Times is the first newspaper to have borne that name, lending it to numerous other papers around the world, such as The Times of India and The New York Times. It is considered a newspaper of record in the UK.

The Times had an average daily circulation of 365,880 in March 2020; in the same period, The Sunday Times had an average weekly circulation of 647,622. The two newspapers also had 304,000 digital-only paid subscribers as of June 2019. An American edition of The Times has been published since 6 June 2006. The Times has been heavily used by scholars and researchers because of its widespread availability in libraries and its detailed index. A complete historical file of the digitised paper, up to 2019, is online from Gale Cengage Learning.

History

1785 to 1890 

The Times was founded by publisher John Walter (1738–1812) on 1 January 1785 as The Daily Universal Register, with Walter in the role of editor. Walter had lost his job by the end of 1784 after the insurance company for which he worked went bankrupt due to losses from a Jamaican hurricane. Unemployed, Walter began a new business venture. At that time, Henry Johnson invented the logography, a new typography that was reputedly faster and more precise (although three years later, it was proved less efficient than advertised). Walter bought the logography's patent and with it opened a printing house to produce books. The first publication of the newspaper The Daily Universal Register was on 1 January 1785. Walter changed the title after 940 editions on 1 January 1788 to The Times. In 1803, Walter handed ownership and editorship to his son of the same name. In spite of Walter Sr's sixteen-month stay in Newgate Prison for libel printed in The Times, his pioneering efforts to obtain Continental news, especially from France, helped build the paper's reputation among policy makers and financiers.

The Times used contributions from significant figures in the fields of politics, science, literature, and the arts to build its reputation. For much of its early life, the profits of The Times were very large and the competition minimal, so it could pay far better than its rivals for information or writers. Beginning in 1814, the paper was printed on the new steam-driven cylinder press developed by Friedrich Koenig (1774–1833). In 1815, The Times had a circulation of 5,000.

Thomas Barnes was appointed general editor in 1817. In the same year, the paper's printer James Lawson died, and passed the business onto his son John Joseph Lawson (1802–1852). Under the editorship of Barnes and his successor in 1841, John Thadeus Delane, the influence of The Times rose to great heights, especially in politics and amongst the City of London. Peter Fraser and Edward Sterling were two noted journalists, and gained for The Times the pompous/satirical nickname 'The Thunderer' (from "We thundered out the other day an article on social and political reform."). The increased circulation and influence of the paper was based in part to its early adoption of the steam-driven rotary printing press. Distribution via steam trains to rapidly growing concentrations of urban populations helped ensure the profitability of the paper and its growing influence.

The Times was one of the first newspapers to send war correspondents to cover particular conflicts. William Howard Russell, the paper's correspondent with the army in the Crimean War, was immensely influential with his dispatches back to England.

1890 to 1981
The Times faced financial extinction in 1890 under Arthur Fraser Walter, but it was rescued by an energetic editor, Charles Frederic Moberly Bell. During his tenure (1890–1911), The Times became associated with selling the Encyclopædia Britannica using aggressive American marketing methods introduced by Horace Everett Hooper and his advertising executive, Henry Haxton. Due to legal fights between the Britannica's two owners, Hooper and Walter Montgomery Jackson, The Times severed its connection in 1908 and was bought by pioneering newspaper magnate, Alfred Harmsworth, later Lord Northcliffe.

In editorials published on 29 and 31 July 1914, Wickham Steed, the Times's Chief Editor, argued that the British Empire should enter World War I. On 8 May 1920, also under the editorship of Steed, The Times in an editorial endorsed the anti-Semitic fabrication The Protocols of the Learned Elders of Zion as a genuine document, and called Jews the world's greatest danger. In the leader entitled "The Jewish Peril, a Disturbing Pamphlet: Call for Inquiry", Steed wrote about The Protocols of the Elders of Zion: What are these 'Protocols'? Are they authentic? If so, what malevolent assembly concocted these plans and gloated over their exposition? Are they forgery? If so, whence comes the uncanny note of prophecy, prophecy in part fulfilled, in part so far gone in the way of fulfillment?". The following year, when Philip Graves, the Constantinople (modern Istanbul) correspondent of The Times, exposed The Protocols as a forgery, The Times retracted the editorial of the previous year.

In 1922, John Jacob Astor, son of the 1st Viscount Astor, bought The Times from the Northcliffe estate. The paper gained a measure of notoriety in the 1930s with its advocacy of German appeasement; editor Geoffrey Dawson was closely allied with those in the government who practised appeasement, most notably Neville Chamberlain. Candid news reports by Norman Ebbut from Berlin that warned of warmongering were rewritten in London to support the appeasement policy.

Kim Philby, a double agent with primary allegiance to the Soviet Union, was a correspondent for the newspaper in Spain during the Spanish Civil War of the late 1930s. Philby was admired for his courage in obtaining high-quality reporting from the front lines of the bloody conflict. He later joined British Military Intelligence (MI6) during World War II, was promoted into senior positions after the war ended, and defected to the Soviet Union when discovery was inevitable in 1963.

Between 1941 and 1946, the left-wing British historian E. H. Carr was assistant editor. Carr was well known for the strongly pro-Soviet tone of his editorials. In December 1944, when fighting broke out in Athens between the Greek Communist ELAS and the British Army, Carr in a Times leader sided with the Communists, leading Winston Churchill to condemn him and the article in a speech to the House of Commons. As a result of Carr's editorial, The Times became popularly known during that stage of World War II as "the threepenny Daily Worker" (the price of the Communist Party's Daily Worker being one penny).

On 3 May 1966, it resumed printing news on the front page – previously the front page had been given over to small advertisements, usually of interest to the moneyed classes in British society. Also in 1966, the Royal Arms, which had been a feature of the newspaper's masthead since its inception, was abandoned. In the same year, members of the Astor family sold the paper to Canadian publishing magnate Roy Thomson. His Thomson Corporation brought it under the same ownership as The Sunday Times to form Times Newspapers Limited.

An industrial dispute prompted the management to shut the paper for nearly a year from 1 December 1978 to 12 November 1979.

The Thomson Corporation management were struggling to run the business due to the 1979 energy crisis and union demands. Management sought a buyer who was in a position to guarantee the survival of both titles, and had the resources and was committed to funding the introduction of modern printing methods.

Several suitors appeared, including Robert Maxwell, Tiny Rowland and Lord Rothermere; however, only one buyer was in a position to meet the full Thomson remit, Australian media magnate Rupert Murdoch. Robert Holmes à Court, another Australian magnate had previously tried to buy The Times in 1980.

From 1981

In 1981, The Times and The Sunday Times were bought from Thomson by Rupert Murdoch's News International. The acquisition followed three weeks of intensive bargaining with the unions by company negotiators John Collier and Bill O'Neill. Murdoch gave legal undertakings to maintain separate journalism resources for the two titles. The Royal Arms was reintroduced to the masthead at about this time, but whereas previously it had been that of the reigning monarch, it would now be that of the House of Hanover, who were on the throne when the newspaper was founded.

After 14 years as editor, William Rees-Mogg resigned upon completion of the change of ownership. Murdoch began to make his mark on the paper by appointing Harold Evans as his replacement. One of his most important changes was the introduction of new technology and efficiency measures. Between March 1981 and May 1982, following agreement with print unions, the hot-metal Linotype printing process used to print The Times since the 19th century was phased out and replaced by computer input and photo-composition. This allowed print room staff at The Times and The Sunday Times to be reduced by half. However, direct input of text by journalists ("single-stroke" input) was still not achieved, and this was to remain an interim measure until the Wapping dispute of 1986, when The Times moved from New Printing House Square in Gray's Inn Road (near Fleet Street) to new offices in Wapping.

Robert Fisk, seven times British International Journalist of the Year, resigned as foreign correspondent in 1988 over what he saw as "political censorship" of his article on the shooting-down of Iran Air Flight 655 in July 1988. He wrote in detail about his reasons for resigning from the paper due to meddling with his stories, and the paper's pro-Israel stance.

In June 1990, The Times ceased its policy of using courtesy titles ("Mr", "Mrs", or "Miss" prefixes) for living persons before full names on first reference, but it continues to use them before surnames on subsequent references. In 1992, it accepted the use of "Ms" for unmarried women "if they express a preference."

In November 2003, News International began producing the newspaper in both broadsheet and tabloid sizes. Over the next year, the broadsheet edition was withdrawn from Northern Ireland, Scotland, and the West Country. Since 1 November 2004, the paper has been printed solely in tabloid format.

On 6 June 2005, The Times redesigned its Letters page, dropping the practice of printing correspondents' full postal addresses. Published letters were long regarded as one of the paper's key constituents. According to its leading article "From Our Own Correspondents", the reason for removal of full postal addresses was to fit more letters onto the page.

In a 2007 meeting with the House of Lords Select Committee on Communications, which was investigating media ownership and the news, Murdoch stated that the law and the independent board prevented him from exercising editorial control.

In May 2008, printing of The Times switched from Wapping to new plants at Waltham Cross in Hertfordshire, and Merseyside and Glasgow, enabling the paper to be produced with full colour on every page for the first time.

On 26 July 2012, to coincide with the official start of the London 2012 Olympics and the issuing of a series of souvenir front covers, The Times added the suffix "of London" to its masthead.

In March 2016, the paper dropped its rolling digital coverage for a series of 'editions' of the paper at 9am, midday and 5pm on weekdays. The change also saw a redesign for the paper's app for smartphones and tablets.

In April 2018, IPSO upheld a complaint against The Times for its report of a court hearing in a Tower Hamlets fostering case.

In April 2019, culture secretary Jeremy Wright said he was minded to allow a request by News UK to relax the legal undertakings given in 1981 to maintain separate journalism resources for The Times and The Sunday Times.

In 2019, IPSO upheld complaints against The Times over their article "GPS data shows container visited trafficking hotspot", and for three articles as part of a series on pollution in Britain's waterways – "No river safe for bathing", "Filthy Business" and "Behind the story". IPSO also upheld complaints in 2019 against articles headlined "Funding secret of scientists against hunt trophy ban", and "Britons lose out to rush of foreign medical students".

Content
The Times features news for the first half of the paper; the Opinion/Comment section begins after the first news section with world news normally following this. The business pages begin on the centre spread, and are followed by The Register, containing obituaries, a Court & Social section, and related material. The sport section is at the end of the main paper. In April 2016, the cover price of The Times became £1.40 on weekdays and £1.50 on Saturdays.

Times2
The Times main supplement, every day, is the times2, featuring various columns. It was discontinued in early March 2010, but reintroduced on 12 October 2010 after discontinuation was criticised. Its regular features include a puzzles section called Mind Games. Its previous incarnation began on 5 September 2005, before which it was called T2 and previously Times 2. The supplement contains arts and lifestyle features, TV and radio listings, and theatre reviews. The newspaper employs Richard Morrison as its classical music critic.

The Game
The Game is included in the newspaper on Mondays, and details all the weekend's football activity (Premier League and Football League Championship, League One and League Two.) The Scottish edition of The Game also includes results and analysis from Scottish Premier League games. During the FIFA World Cup and UEFA Euros there is a daily supplement of The Game.

Saturday supplements
The Saturday edition of The Times contains a variety of supplements. These supplements were relaunched in January 2009 as: Sport, Saturday Review (arts, books, TV listings and ideas), Weekend (including travel and lifestyle features), Playlist (an entertainment listings guide) and The Times Magazine (columns on various topics).

The Times Magazine
The Times Magazine features columns touching on various subjects such as celebrities, fashion and beauty, food and drink, homes and gardens or simply writers' anecdotes. Notable contributors include Giles Coren, Food and Drink Writer of the Year in 2005 and Nadiya Hussain, winner of The Great British Bake Off.

Online presence

The Times and The Sunday Times have had an online presence since 1996, originally at the-times.co.uk and sunday-times.co.uk, and later at timesonline.co.uk. There are now two websites: thetimes.co.uk is aimed at daily readers, and the thesundaytimes.co.uk site at providing weekly magazine-like content. There are also iPad and Android editions of both newspapers. Since July 2010, News UK has required readers who do not subscribe to the print edition to pay £2 per week to read The Times and The Sunday Times online.

Visits to the websites have decreased by 87% since the paywall was introduced, from 21 million unique users per month to 2.7 million. In April 2009, the timesonline site had a readership of 750,000 readers per day. In October 2011, there were around 111,000 subscribers to The Times digital products. A Reuters Institute survey in 2021 put the number of digital subscribers at around 400,000, and ranked The Times as having the sixth highest trust rating out of 13 different outlets polled.

The Times Digital Archive is available by subscription.

Ownership
The Times has had the following eight owners since its foundation in 1785:

 1785 to 1803 – John Walter
 1803 to 1847 – John Walter, 2nd
 1847 to 1894 – John Walter, 3rd
 1894 to 1908 – Arthur Fraser Walter
 1908 to 1922 – Lord Northcliffe
 1922 to 1966 – Astor family
 1966 to 1981 – Roy Thomson
 1981 to present – News UK (formerly News International, a wholly owned subsidiary of News Corp, run by Rupert Murdoch)

Readership
At the time of Harold Evans' appointment as editor in 1981, The Times had an average daily sale of 282,000 copies in comparison to the 1.4 million daily sales of its traditional rival The Daily Telegraph. By November 2005, The Times sold an average of 691,283 copies per day, the second-highest of any British "quality" newspaper (after The Daily Telegraph, which had a circulation of 903,405 copies in the period), and the highest in terms of full-rate sales. By March 2014, average daily circulation of The Times had fallen to 394,448 copies, compared to The Daily Telegraph'''s 523,048, with the two retaining respectively the second-highest and highest circulations among British "quality" newspapers. In contrast The Sun, the highest-selling "tabloid" daily newspaper in the United Kingdom, sold an average of 2,069,809 copies in March 2014, and the Daily Mail, the highest-selling "middle market" British daily newspaper, sold an average of 1,708,006 copies in the period.The Sunday Times has a significantly higher circulation than The Times, and sometimes outsells The Sunday Telegraph. In January 2019, The Times had a circulation of 417,298 and The Sunday Times 712,291.

In a 2009 national readership survey, The Times was found to have the highest number of ABC1 25–44 readers and the largest numbers of readers in London of any of the "quality" papers.

TypefaceThe Times is the originator of the widely used Times New Roman typeface, originally developed by Stanley Morison of The Times in collaboration with the Monotype Corporation for its legibility in low-tech printing. In November 2006, The Times began printing headlines in a new typeface, Times Modern. The Times was printed in broadsheet format for 219 years, but switched to compact size in 2004 in an attempt to appeal more to younger readers and commuters using public transport. The Sunday Times remains a broadsheet.

In 1908, The Times started using the Monotype Modern typeface.The Times commissioned the serif typeface Times New Roman, created by Victor Lardent at the English branch of Monotype, in 1931. It was commissioned after Stanley Morison had written an article criticizing The Times for being badly printed and typographically antiquated. The typeface was supervised by Morison and drawn by Victor Lardent, an artist from the advertising department of The Times. Morison used an older typeface named Plantin as the basis for his design, but made revisions for legibility and economy of space. Times New Roman made its debut in the issue of 3 October 1932. After one year, the design was released for commercial sale. The Times stayed with Times New Roman for 40 years, but new production techniques and the format change from broadsheet to tabloid in 2004 have caused the newspaper to switch typeface five times since 1972. However, all the new typeface have been variants of the original New Roman type:
 Times Europa was designed by Walter Tracy in 1972 for The Times, as a sturdier alternative to the Times font family, designed for the demands of faster printing presses and cheaper paper. The typeface features more open counter spaces.
 Times Roman replaced Times Europa on 30 August 1982.
 Times Millennium was made in 1991, drawn by Gunnlaugur Briem on the instructions of Aurobind Patel, composing manager of News International.
 Times Classic first appeared in 2001. Designed as an economical face by the British type team of Dave Farey and Richard Dawson, it took advantage of the new PC-based publishing system at the newspaper, while obviating the production shortcomings of its predecessor Times Millennium. The new typeface included 120 letters per font. Initially the family comprised ten fonts, but a condensed version was added in 2004.
 Times Modern was unveiled on 20 November 2006, as the successor of Times Classic. Designed for improving legibility in smaller font sizes, it uses 45-degree angled bracket serifs. The typeface was published by Elsner + Flake as EF Times Modern; it was designed by Research Studios, led by Ben Preston (deputy editor of The Times) and designer Neville Brody.

Political alignment
Historically, the paper was not overtly pro-Tory or Whig, but has been a long time bastion of the British Establishment and empire. In 1959, the historian of journalism Allan Nevins analysed the importance of The Times in shaping the views of events of London's elite, writing:
For much more than a century The Times has been an integral and important part of the political structure of Great Britain. Its news and its editorial comment have in general been carefully coordinated, and have at most times been handled with an earnest sense of responsibility. While the paper has admitted some trivia to its columns, its whole emphasis has been on important public affairs treated with an eye to the best interests of Britain. To guide this treatment, the editors have for long periods been in close touch with 10 Downing Street.The Times adopted a stance described as "peculiarly detached" at the 1945 general election; although it was increasingly critical of the Conservative Party's campaign, it did not advocate a vote for any one party. However, the newspaper reverted to the Conservatives for the next election five years later. It supported the Conservatives for the subsequent three elections, followed by support for both the Conservatives and the Liberal Party for the next five elections, expressly supporting a Con–Lib coalition in 1974. The paper then backed the Conservatives solidly until 1997, when it declined to make any party endorsement but supported individual (primarily Eurosceptic) candidates.

For the 2001 general election, The Times declared its support for Tony Blair's Labour government, which was re-elected by a landslide (although not as large as in 1997). It supported Labour again in 2005, when Labour achieved a third successive win, though with a reduced majority. In 2004, according to MORI, the voting intentions of its readership were 40% for the Conservative Party, 29% for the Liberal Democrats, and 26% for Labour. For the 2010 general election, the newspaper declared its support for the Conservatives once again; the election ended in the Tories taking the most votes and seats but having to form a coalition with the Liberal Democrats in order to form a government as they had failed to gain an overall majority.

Its changes in political alignment make it the most varied newspaper in terms of political support in British history. Some columnists in The Times are connected to the Conservative Party such as Daniel Finkelstein, Tim Montgomerie, Matthew Parris, and Matt Ridley, but there are also columnists connected to the Labour Party such as David Aaronovitch and Jenni Russell.The Times occasionally makes endorsements for foreign elections. In November 2012, it endorsed a second term for Democrat Barack Obama although it also expressed reservations about his foreign policy.

During the 2019 Conservative leadership election, The Times endorsed Boris Johnson, and subsequently endorsed the Conservative Party in the general election of that year.

Libel cases against The Times
Imam Abdullah Patel
In 2019, The Times published an article about Imam Abdullah Patel which wrongly claimed Patel had blamed Israel for the 2003 murder of a British police officer by a terror suspect in Manchester. The story also wrongly claimed that Patel ran a primary school that had been criticised by Ofsted for segregating parents at events, which Ofsted said was contrary to "British democratic principles". The Times settled Patel's defamation claim by issuing an apology and offering to pay damages and legal costs. Patel's solicitor, Zillur Rahman, said the case "highlights the shocking level of journalism to which the Muslim community are often subject".

Sultan Choudhury
In 2019, The Times published an article titled "Female Circumcision is like clipping a nail, claimed speaker". The article featured a photo of Sultan Choudhury beside the headline, leading some readers to incorrectly infer that Choudhury had made the comment. Choudhury lodged a complaint with the Independent Press Standards Organisation and sued The Times for libel. In 2020, The Times issued an apology, amended its article and agreed to pay Choudhury damages and legal costs. Choudhury's solicitor, Nishtar Saleem, said "This is another example of irresponsible journalism. Publishing sensational excerpts on a ‘free site’ whilst concealing the full article behind a paywall is a dangerous game".

Cage

In December 2020, Cage and Moazzam Begg received damages of £30,000 plus costs in a libel case they had brought against The Times newspaper. In June 2020, a report in The Times had suggested that Cage and Begg were supporting a man who had been arrested in relation to a knife attack in Reading in which three men were murdered. The Times report also suggested that Cage and Begg were excusing the actions of the accused man by mentioning mistakes made by the police and others. In addition to paying damages, The Times printed an apology. Cage stated that the damages amount would be used to "expose state-sponsored Islamophobia and those complicit with it in the press. ... The Murdoch press empire has actively supported xenophobic elements and undermined principles of open society and accountability. ... We will continue to shine a light on war criminals and torture apologists and press barons who fan the flames of hate".

SponsorshipsThe Times, along with the British Film Institute, sponsors "The Times" bfi London Film Festival. It also sponsors the Cheltenham Literature Festival and the Asia House Festival of Asian Literature at Asia House, London.

Editors

Related publications
An Irish digital edition of the paper was launched in September 2015 at TheTimes.ie. A print edition was launched in June 2017, replacing the international edition previously distributed in Ireland. The Irish edition was set to close in June 2019 with the loss of 20 jobs.The Times Literary Supplement (TLS) first appeared in 1902 as a supplement to The Times, becoming a separately paid-for weekly literature and society magazine in 1914. The TLS is owned and published by News International and co-operates closely with The Times, with its online version hosted on The Times website, and its editorial offices based in 1 London Bridge Street, London.

Between 1951 and 1966, The Times published a separately paid-for quarterly science review, The Times Science Review. The Times started a new, free, monthly science magazine, Eureka, in October 2009. The magazine closed in October 2012.

Times Atlases have been produced since 1895. They are currently produced by the Collins Bartholomew imprint of HarperCollins Publishers. The flagship product is The Times Comprehensive Atlas of the World.

In 1971, The Times began publishing the Times Higher Education Supplement (now known as the Times Higher Education) which focuses its coverage on tertiary education.

In popular culture
In the dystopian future world of George Orwell's Nineteen Eighty-Four, The Times has been transformed into an organ of the totalitarian ruling party. The book's lead character Winston Smith is employed in the task of rewriting past issues of the newspaper for the Ministry of Truth.

Rex Stout's fictional detective Nero Wolfe is described as fond of solving the London Times crossword puzzle at his New York home, in preference to those of American papers.

In the James Bond series by Ian Fleming, James Bond reads The Times. As described by Fleming in From Russia, with Love: The Times was "the only paper that Bond ever read."

 See also 

 History of journalism in the United Kingdom
 List of the oldest newspapers

 References 

 Further reading 
 Bingham, Adrian. "The Times Digital Archive, 1785–2006 (Gale Cengage)," English Historical Review (2013) 128#533 pp. 1037–1040. 
  - includes sections of black-and-white photographic plates, plus a few charts and diagrams in text pages.
 Merrill, John C. and Harold A. Fisher. The world's great dailies: profiles of fifty newspapers (1980) pp. 320–29.
 Morison, Stanley. The History of the Times: Volume 1: The Thunderer" in the Making 1785–1841. Volume 2: The Tradition Established 1841–1884. Volume 3: The Twentieth Century Test 1884–1912. Volume 4 [published in two parts]:The 150th Anniversary and Beyond 1912–1948. (1952)
 Riggs, Bruce Timothy.   "Geoffrey Dawson, editor of "The Times" (London), and his contribution to the appeasement movement" (PhD dissertation, U of North Texas, 1993) online, bibliography pp 229–33.

 External links 

 Times (London, England) Collection at the Harry Ransom Center
 
 The Sunday Times site
 
  (archives)
 
 Anthony Trollope's satire on the mid-nineteenth century Times
 Journalism Now: The Times Winchester University Journalism History project on The Times in the 19th century
 Times World Atlases official website including a History and Heritage section detailing landmark Times'' atlases
 Archive from 1785 to 2008 – full text and original layout, searchable (not free of charge, registration required)
 
 The Times editor Robert Thomson lecture online: From the editorial desk of The Times, RMIT School of Applied Communication Public Lecture series

 
Centre-right newspapers
Conservative media in the United Kingdom
National newspapers published in the United Kingdom
Newspapers published in London
News Corporation subsidiaries
Newspapers established in 1785
1785 establishments in England
1785 establishments in Great Britain
Daily newspapers published in the United Kingdom